Anthony Bruce Brewer (born November 25, 1957) is an American former professional baseball outfielder.  He appeared in 24 games for the Los Angeles Dodgers during the  Major League Baseball season. He went on to a productive career with the Nippon-Ham Fighters, where he batted .307 with 99 home runs in four seasons.

He played college baseball at the University of Miami.

He went to Palo Alto Senior High School and played football, baseball and wrestling. He qualified for the CIF state tournament for wrestling.

External links

1957 births
Living people
Major League Baseball outfielders
Los Angeles Dodgers players
Nippon Ham Fighters players
American expatriate baseball players in Japan
Baseball players from Louisiana
Vero Beach Dodgers players
Lodi Dodgers players
Albuquerque Dukes players
San Antonio Dodgers players
Miami Hurricanes baseball players
African-American baseball players
Palo Alto High School alumni
Junior college baseball players in the United States